Ari is an unincorporated community in Allen and Noble counties, in the U.S. state of Indiana.

History
A post office was established at Ari in 1872, and remained in operation until it was discontinued in 1914.

Geography

References

Unincorporated communities in Allen County, Indiana
Unincorporated communities in Noble County, Indiana
Unincorporated communities in Indiana